Thue may refer to:

 Axel Thue, a Norwegian mathematician
 Thue (programming language)
 Thue (food), a Tibetan dessert